Kosovo–United States relations are diplomatic relations between the Republic of Kosovo and the United States of America. The United States officially recognized the Republic of Kosovo as a country, which declared independence from Serbia on February 17, 2008, the next day.

History 

The US established full diplomatic relations at Ambassador level with the Republic of Kosovo. Kosovo considers the United States its greatest partner in gaining recognition from the rest of the world, and such view is also expressed from United States Officials.

The United States and Kosovo established diplomatic relations on February 18, 2008. U.S. President George W. Bush on February 19, 2008 stated that recognizing Kosovo as an independent nation would "bring peace to a region scarred by war". The bilateral ties the United States shares with Kosovo are maintained through the U.S. Embassy in Pristina, which was opened on April 8, 2008 by then-Chargé d'Affaires ad interim Tina Kaidanow. Prior to the declaration of independence, the United States maintained U.S. Office Pristina (USOP), with a chief of mission. The US also continues to contribute troops to the Kosovo Force (KFOR), and will be providing staff to the ICO and EULEX missions.

During the European Commission-hosted international Donors' Conference on July 11, 2008 the United States pledged $400 million for 2008–2009 to support, among many other things, helping relieve debt Kosovo may inherit. U.S. assistance in Kosovo continues to support governance through strengthening civil society and political processes, especially targeting minority communities, and aims to strengthen economic institutions and help private enterprise grow.

In May 2009, then Vice President Biden visited Kosovo and was greeted by large crowds. He affirmed the US position that Kosovan "independence is irreversible". The Obama administration remained committed to Kosovo. In August 2016, Vice President Joe Biden, visited Kosovo and attended a ceremony that renamed a southeastern highway "Joseph R. 'Beau' Biden, III" to honour his son Beau's contribution to Kosovo for training its judges and prosecutors. The US has a large military base in Kosovo named Camp Bondsteel, and it forms part of its defence strategy for the region.

Kosovo has named certain places in Pristina after U.S. leaders such as Bill Clinton Boulevard and George W. Bush Street. Around Pristina, other streets are named after former military commanders involved in the NATO campaign, honouring their role to conflict between local Albanians and the Yugoslav army. The capital also has a women's clothing shop named Hillary, after Hillary Clinton and atop on some large buildings and hotels architectural features replicating US monuments and symbols like the Statue of Liberty or the bald eagle. In Kosovo, Bill Clinton is considered an iconic figure and hero. Many US flags are flown throughout Kosovo from buildings. The US donated funds and built one of the largest film studios in Europe, located in the suburbs of Pristina.

Widespread sentiments of gratitude are held by people in Kosovo to the US for playing a major role in ending Serb control of the area. These sentiments increased, including support toward the US, especially after it recognised Kosovan independence. The Kosovo population also support the US engagement with the Balkans, which is viewed as anti-Serbian. After the Kosovo War, the US remains popular among the Kosovo Albanian population. According to the 2012 U.S. Global Leadership Report, 87% of Kosovars approve of U.S. leadership, the highest rating for any survey in Europe. According to a 2016 report by Gallup, Kosovo led the region and the world again in approval for the second consecutive year, with 85% approving of U.S. leadership. According to a recent report by Gallup of U.S. Leadership on Trump's term, Kosovo led the region and the world again in approving of U.S leadership with 75% approval.

US-mediated Kosovo–Serbia negotiations

On October 4, 2019, U.S. President Donald Trump appointed Richard Grenell as the Special Presidential Envoy for Serbia and Kosovo Peace Negotiations. After months of diplomatic talks, on January 20, 2020, Serbia and Kosovo agreed to restore flights between Belgrade and Pristina for the first time in over 20 years.

On September 4, 2020, the President of Serbia, Aleksandar Vučić, and the Prime Minister of Kosovo, Avdullah Hoti, signed an agreement on the normalisation of economic relations between Serbia and Kosovo at the White House. The deal will encompass freer transit, including by rail and road, while both parties agreed to work with the Export–Import Bank of the United States and the U.S. International Development Finance Corporation and to join the Mini Schengen Zone, but the agreement also included the mutual recognition between Israel and Kosovo.

The United States, along with other western countries like France, Germany, Italy and the United Kingdom have engaged with the governments of Kosovo and Serbia to find a practical solution which would allow eligible citizens of Kosovo to exercise their right to participate in Serbia’s 2022 elections.

U.S. embassy

The sixth and current United States Ambassador to Kosovo is Jeffrey Hovenier.

Kosovo embassy
Vlora Çitaku is the current ambassador from Kosovo to the U.S. The Embassy of the Republic of Kosovo in the United States is located in Washington DC.

See also

 List of ambassadors of Kosovo to the United States
 United States–Yugoslavia relations

Notes

References

External links
 History of Kosovo - U.S. relations

 
Bilateral relations of the United States
United States